Ayurved College Sion (also known as Sion Ayurved) is an ayurvedic educational institute run by Ayurvidya Prasarak Mandal, situated beside Sion railway station in Mumbai. The college was founded in 1954. Among the former students is Madhav Sane, founder of ayurvedic clinic chain Madhavbaug Clinics .
 Each year the college organizes an annual event called Sheevmanthan.

References

External links
http://www.muhs.ac.in
https://web.archive.org/web/20121228214439/http://www.ccimindia.org/colleges_status_ayurveda_2012-13.htm

Universities and colleges in Mumbai
Educational institutions established in 1954
1954 establishments in Bombay State